One Hundred Days in Palermo is a 1984 non-fiction film directed by Giuseppe Ferrara with Giuseppe Tornatore as screenplay writer. The film is a France/Italy coproduction and tells about the last hundred days in the life of the Italian "Generale dei Carabinieri" and anti-mafia highest authority Carlo Alberto Dalla Chiesa as prefect of Palermo, the capital of the Italian island of Sicily. Dalla Chiesa's life ended with his barbaric murder, shot by the machine guns of a mafia squad (along his wife and his bodyguard) on September 3, 1982.

Cast
 Lino Ventura as General Carlo Alberto Dalla Chiesa
 Giuliana De Sio as Emanuela Setti Carraro
 Lino Troisi as Pio La Torre
 Stefano Satta Flores as Captain Fontana
 Arnoldo Foà as Virginio Rognoni 
 Andrea Aureli
 Accursio Di Leo
 Adalberto Maria Merli

External links 
 
  Cent jours à Palerme presented by www.cinemovies.fr
  Cento giorni a Palermo presented by Italian Yahoo! Cinema

1984 films
1980s gang films
Crime films based on actual events
Films about assassinations
Films about the Sicilian Mafia
Films directed by Giuseppe Ferrara
Films set in 1982
Films set in Sicily
Political films based on actual events
1980s political thriller films
Italian political thriller films
1980s Italian films
Cultural depictions of Italian men